The first USS Adirondack was a large and powerful screw-assisted sloop of war with heavy guns, contracted by the Union Navy early in the American Civil War. She was intended for use by the Union Navy as a warship in support of the Union Navy blockade of Confederate waterways. Her career with the Navy proved to be short, yet active and historically important.

Construction and design
Adirondack was built at the New York Navy Yard in Brooklyn, New York. Her machinery, consisting of two  cylinder,  stroke horizontal back-acting steam engines and two Martin's patent boilers, powering a single  screw propeller, was constructed by the Novelty Iron Works of New York City. The engines were fitted with a Sewall's tonface condenser and a distilling apparatus, capable of producing  of water in a 24-hour period.

Adirondack was laid down in 1861; launched on 22 February 1862; sponsored by Ms. Mary Paulding, a daughter of Flag Officer Hiram Paulding, the Commandant of the New York Navy Yard; named for the Adirondack Mountains, and commissioned on 30 June 1862, Commander Guert Gansevoort in command.

Civil War
Although Adirondack was originally slated for duty in the West Gulf Blockading Squadron, events in the Bahamas changed her fate. Before she sailed for the Gulf of Mexico, news reached Washington, D.C. that the British-built screw steamer Oreto — later known as the CSS Florida — had arrived at the island of New Providence and, although constructed under the pretext of being a merchantman destined for service under the Italian Government, was in reality a cruiser which was then being fitted out as a Confederate commerce raider. Thus, on 11 July, Secretary of the Navy (SecNav) Gideon Welles ordered Gansevoort to proceed in Adirondack to the West Indies to investigate the report.

Adirondack sails for the Bahamas, captures Emma
The new Union screw-sloop of war departed New York City on 17 July and headed for the Bahamas. Six days out, she chanced upon a schooner and, after a two-hour chase, boarded the stranger which proved to be a Baltimore, Maryland-built vessel named  which was operating out of Nassau, Bahamas, under a British colonial register. Since the schooner's master had only recently arrived in the West Indies in command of the blockade runner Ann E. Barry, and since Emma was laden with ". . . articles of great need in the so-called Confederate States," Gansevoort sent her to Philadelphia, Pennsylvania, under a prize crew.

He again gave chase and fired upon the fleeing ship; but, this time, his quarry's speed enabled her to reach the neutral port safely.

British authorities protest chase of Herald
Some two hours later, a boat from the Royal Navy sloop of war  pulled alongside Adirondack as she approached Nassau and delivered a letter to the American steamer protesting her role in the recent chase and informing Gansevoort that the elusive steamer was named Herald and had been"... struck two or three times with shot ... " during the action.

Shortly thereafter, Adirondack anchored in the roadstead off Nassau harbor, and Gansevoort sent Greyhounds commanding officer a written reply to the protest, justifying his course of action.

He then went ashore where he learned that Herald — commanded by " ... the notorious rebel Coxetter, formerly captain of the rebel privateer Jeff. Davis" — had returned from Charleston, South Carolina, laden with cotton after delivering a cargo of ammunition to that Confederate port.

Adirondack reports on legal status of the raider
Since Adirondack had encountered extremely severe weather during her passage out from New York, she remained at Nassau for three days undergoing voyage repairs and replenishing her coal bunkers. Gansevoort took advantage of his ship's stay in port to learn of conditions there before sailing for the Virginia Capes on 28 July. Upon arriving at Hampton Roads, Virginia, on 4 August, he reported that Oreto was indeed a Confederate cruiser, but that she was then
"... in charge of a prize crew from the Greyhound, and proceedings have been instituted in the admiralty court of the Bahamas for her condemnation for a violation of the foreign enlistment act of Great Britain ..."

His dispatch to Washington also stated that sentiment in the Bahamas was strongly in favor of the South. Thus the outcome of the judicial action against the warship — which would later be freed and win fame as the Southern raider Florida — was in doubt.

Adirondack sailed to Bahamas again to investigate further rumors
On 12 August, SecNav Welles ordered Adirondack to proceed to Port Royal, South Carolina, to report to Rear Admiral Samuel Francis Du Pont for duty in the South Atlantic Blockading Squadron. The next day, a report reached Washington, D.C., that another British built cruiser – which would later prey on Union shipping as CSS Alabama – had slipped out of England and was heading for Nassau. Anxiety over this new threat prompted Welles to send Adirondack back to the Bahamas to investigate. Nevertheless, before this message reached Hampton Roads, the steamer had sailed for Port Royal in compliance with her orders of the 12th. Word of her new mission finally caught up with her there on the 18th and she got underway for Nassau that afternoon.

Adirondack strikes a reef in the Bahamas, and sinks
All went well until the morning of 23 August 1862, when Adirondack struck a reef off the northeast point of Man-O-War Cay of the Little Bahama Bank group. The shock immediately disabled her engine, and daylong efforts by the ship's crew, with the aid of local wreckers, proved futile.

That evening, with her back broken and her keel forced up through the engine room, the ship bilged. Fortunately, she suffered no personnel casualties.

See also

List of sloops of war of the United States Navy
Bibliography of early American naval history

References

Ships built in Brooklyn
Ships of the Union Navy
Steamships of the United States Navy
Sloops of the United States Navy
American Civil War patrol vessels of the United States
1862 ships
Shipwrecks of the American Civil War
Shipwrecks of the Bahamas
Maritime incidents in August 1862